Allak is a dong in Dongnae-gu, Busan, South Korea.  It is divided into two administrative dong, Allak 1-dong and Allak 2-dong. The total area is 2.31 km2, with a population of 18,560.  It borders Geumjeong-gu on the north.

The name "Allak" gained dong status in 1953.  It was split into two administrative dong in 1990.  Each dong office has ten employees.

See also
Geography of South Korea
Administrative divisions of South Korea

External links
Allak 1-dong website, in Korean
Allak 2-dong website, in Korean

Dongnae District
Neighbourhoods in Busan